During the 1988–89 season, Newcastle United participated in the Football League First Division. During the summer the club invested heavily in their squad, attempting to offset the loss of rising star Paul Gascoigne to Tottenham Hotspur for a then club record fee. The FA Cup winners Dave Beasant and Andy Thorn were signed from Wimbledon for £850,000 each, and the Scotsmen John Robertson and John Hendrie also joined as the club spent the £2.2 million it received for Gascoigne. The loss of Gascoigne proved to be the straw that broke the camel's back so soon after selling Peter Beardsley and Chris Waddle, and promising youngster Michael O'Neill, struggling with loss of form and injuries along with the enigmatic Brazilian Mirandinha, were in and out of the team all season.

Newcastle United were relegated, finishing bottom after changing their manager two months into the season. Willie McFaul was sacked as manager after a 3–0 home defeat to Coventry City, a week after the team had beaten the League champions Liverpool at Anfield. The new manager Jim Smith, who struggled to change the team's fortunes, set about 'wheeling and dealing' that saw many changes to the squad. Beasant and Robertson were replaced by the inexperienced Northern Irish goalkeeper Tommy Wright and the expatriate striker Rob McDonald. Other signings included the ex-England international Kenny Sansom, the experienced right back Ray Ranson and the Danish pair Bjørn Kristensen and Frank Pingel, but these changes had little effect and failed to stop the club's slide towards the Second Division, as they collected only two points from their last nine matches.

League table

Results

Squad
(Substitute appearances in brackets)

Coaching staff

Sources

External links
Newcastle United Football Club - Fixtures 1988-89
Season Details - 1988-89 - toon1892

Newcastle United F.C. seasons
Newcastle United